Major Sir Patrick Ashley Cooper (18 November 1887 – 22 March 1961) was a British businessman who for more than two decades was governor of the Hudson's Bay Company and director of the Bank of England. He served as High Sheriff of the County of London and as High Sheriff of Hertfordshire.

Early life and education

Ashley Cooper was born in Aberdeen, the eldest son of Patrick Cooper, and Mary Cook of Ashley, Aberdeenshire. He was educated at Fettes College in Edinburgh before attending Trinity Hall, Cambridge, and Aberdeen University, studying law.

Career

War service
In 1906, Ashley Cooper joined the Volunteer Corps. He was commissioned as a 2nd Lieutenant in the 1st Aberdeenshire division, 2nd Highland Brigade, of the Royal Field Artillery. In 1913, he joined the 7th London Brigade as a lieutenant.

During the First World War, Ashley Cooper served in France with the Royal Field Artillery. He was wounded in 1915 and twice mentioned in dispatches, and was promoted to Major. He later served as Assistant Deputy Director-General of the Trench Warfare Department and Assistant Controller for Gun Ammunition.

During the Second World War, Ashley Cooper served on the Supply Council and as Director-General of Finance and Contracts at the Ministry of Supply from 1939 to 1942. According to The Times, he put his experience to great use during the war:

He was knighted in the 1944 New Year Honours for his wartime service.

Business career

After the First World War, he was engaged in financial and industrial reorganisation for some years, and, in 1931, he was appointed a member of the National Economy Committee.

From 1931 to 1952, Cooper was Governor (Company Chairman) of the Hudson's Bay Company, North America's oldest company (established by English royal charter in 1670). The company was struggling when he took over, and his obituary in The Times explains:

Ashley Cooper held a number of other positions at various organisations. He was a director of the Bank of England (1932–55), a member of the famed May Committee on National Expenditure (1931), a governor of Guy's Hospital (1926–53), was a member of the London Passenger Transport Board (1933–47), and a member of the Rhodesia-Nyasaland Royal Commission (1938).

Ashley Cooper was High Sheriff of the County of London (1944 and 1957) and of Hertfordshire in 1946.

Personal life
He married Kathleen Spickett of Pontypridd, Glamorgan, and they adopted the surname of Ashley Cooper. They had one son and two daughters. They resided at Hexton Manor in Hexton, Hertfordshire. One of his daughters, Cynthia, married Conservative MP Paul Bryan.

He died at sea in 1961, aged 73.

References 

1887 births
1961 deaths
People educated at Fettes College
Alumni of Trinity Hall, Cambridge
British Army personnel of World War I
People associated with the Bank of England
Governors of the Hudson's Bay Company
People from Aberdeen
Royal Field Artillery officers
High Sheriffs of the County of London
High Sheriffs of Hertfordshire
People who died at sea
20th-century English businesspeople
Military personnel from Aberdeen
Civil servants in the Ministry of Supply